Szvetlana Keszthelyi (born 11 August 1971) is a Hungarian alpine skier. She competed in four events at the 1994 Winter Olympics.

References

1971 births
Living people
Hungarian female alpine skiers
Olympic alpine skiers of Hungary
Alpine skiers at the 1994 Winter Olympics
Sportspeople from Kropyvnytskyi